Colégio Bandeirantes is a private secondary school located in São Paulo, opened in 1934. The school has students from many parts of the city and also from different states of Brazil.

It is a co-educational, privately funded institution which offers middle school and senior high programs to 2,770 students.

Bandeirantes' president director, Mauro de Salles Aguiar, also participates in the advisory council of São Paulo's Harvard office.

Notable alumni
 Mario Covas Júnior, 1930–2001, former governor of São Paulo state
 Alberto Goldman, b. 1937, former governor of São Paulo state and minister of transports
 Fernando Haddad, b. 1963, former minister of education, former mayor of São Paulo (2013–16)
 Miguel Nicolelis, b. 1961,  physician and scientist best known for his pioneering work in "reading monkey thought"

International College Program
Bandeirantes has a high acceptance level among top American and European universities, students have been sent to Stanford, Princeton, Northwestern, Duke, Columbia, Oxford, IMI, MIT and others. The school is one of the SAT's test centers in São Paulo.

Extracurricular Programs
Bandeirantes offers an extra curricular program to their Junior year students called Open City in association with Harvard University and the MIT in which the alumni create a year-long project with the goal of making life for citizens in São Paulo better.

For Sophomore students there is the option of enrolling in to MONU-EM, which translates as the United Nations Model for High-School Students. During one semester the political events of great importance of modern times are discussed and there are many simulations of debate sessions between UN diplomats. At the course' end, there is a final simulation of 4 hours that is transmitted in real time via internet.

Junior students from the Humanities class take part in the ICONS project, in association with the University of Maryland. The ICONS project is a diplomatic simulation, modeled on foreign relations summits, with students from several American countries.

The science fair occurs in an annual base and is very competitive; various teams prepare their works for 8 months before presenting it to the public and to the judges who are university professors and important science figures.

Spanish classes are optative and intend to prepare the student to the C1 DELE exam which the school also offers at the end and middle of each year.

Calculus, Biotechnology, Theater, Preparation for Academic Olympiads and Mechatronics are also optative and designed for Junior year students while Idade Mídia (Media Age) is intended only to Humanities course students.

References

External links
 Colégio Bandeirantes

Educational institutions established in 1934
Private schools in Brazil
1934 establishments in Brazil
Schools in São Paulo